Santschiella is an Afrotropical  genus of ants in the subfamily Formicinae. It contains the single species Santschiella kohli, described by Forel in 1916 from the Democratic Republic of the Congo. The genus is known only from workers, measuring about 3 mm in length and with large eyes. Forel (1917) placed Santschiella in its own tribe, Santschiellini, where it remain until Bolton (2003) moved it to Gesomyrmecini.

References

External links

Formicinae
Monotypic ant genera
Hymenoptera of Africa